Princess Fawzia-Latifa (فوزية لطيفة; born 12 February 1982) is the daughter of Fuad II (last King of Egypt) by his wife, Fadila (born Dominique-France Loeb-Picard).

Early life
Fawzia-Latifa was born on 12 February 1982 in Monte Carlo, Monaco. She was named Fawzia after her grandfather's sister, Princess Fawzia Fuad of Egypt, (former queen of Iran) and her father's half-sister, Princess Fawzia Farouk of Egypt. She was named Latifa after Lalla Latifa Amahzoune, the Mother of the Princes of Morocco.

Fawzia-Latifa was educated at:

 Lycée Janson de Sailly, Paris, France.
 Institut Le Rosey, boarding school in Rolle, Switzerland.
 Sciences Po Strasbourg (IEP Strasbourg), France.
 National Institute for Oriental Languages and Civilizations, France.
 The University of Paris 8 Vincennes-Saint-Denis, France.
 
Fawzia Latifa works in the field of public relations and media. She has also worked as a diplomat with the delegation of the Principality of Monaco in Berlin/Germany.

Marriage
On 19 January 2019, at her father's residence in Geneva, she married Sylvain Jean-Baptiste Alexandre Renaudeau (born on 9 November 1979), a French electronic engineer working in Monaco. They have two children.

Honours
  Decoration of Al Kemal in brilliants.

Ancestry

References

Muhammad Ali dynasty 
1982 births
Living people
INALCO alumni
Egyptian princesses 
Monegasque people of Egyptian descent
Monegasque people of French descent
Monegasque people of Jewish descent
Egyptian people of French descent
Egyptian people of Jewish descent
Daughters of kings
Alumni of Institut Le Rosey